In computing, associative containers refer to a group of class templates in the standard library of the C++ programming language that implement ordered associative arrays. Being templates, they can be used to store arbitrary elements, such as integers or custom classes. The following containers are defined in the current revision of the C++ standard: set, map, multiset, multimap. Each of these containers differ only on constraints placed on their elements.

The associative containers are similar to the unordered associative containers in C++ standard library, the only difference is that the unordered associative containers, as their name implies, do not order their elements.

Design

Characteristics

 Key uniqueness: in map and set each key must be unique. multimap and multiset do not have this restriction.
 Element composition: in map and multimap each element is composed from a key and a mapped value. In set and multiset each element is key; there are no mapped values.
 Element ordering: elements follow a strict weak ordering

Associative containers are designed to be especially efficient in accessing its elements by their key, as opposed to sequence containers which are more efficient in accessing elements by their position. Associative containers are guaranteed to perform operations of insertion, deletion, and testing whether an element is in it, in logarithmic time – O(log n). As such, they are typically implemented using self-balancing binary search trees and support bidirectional iteration. Iterators and references are not invalidated by insert and erase operations, except for iterators and references to erased elements.The defining characteristic of associative containers is that elements are inserted in a pre-defined order, such as sorted ascending.
 
The associative containers can be grouped into two subsets: maps and sets. A map, sometimes referred to as a dictionary, consists of a key/value pair. The key is used to order the sequence, and the value is somehow associated with that key. For example, a map might contain keys representing every unique word in a text and values representing the number of times that word appears in the text. A set is simply an ascending container of unique elements.
 
As stated earlier, map and set only allow one instance of a key or element to be inserted into the container. If multiple instances of elements are required, use multimap or multiset.
 
Both maps and sets support bidirectional iterators. For more information on iterators, see Iterators.
 
While not officially part of the STL standard, hash_map and hash_set are commonly used to improve searching times. These containers store their elements as a hash table, with each table entry containing a bidirectional linked list of elements. To ensure the fastest search times (O(1)), make sure that the hashing algorithm for your elements returns evenly distributed hash values.

Performance

The asymptotic complexity of the operations that can be applied to associative containers are as follows:

Overview of functions

The containers are defined in headers named after the names of the containers, e.g. set is defined in header <set>. All containers satisfy the requirements of the Container concept, which means they have begin(), end(), size(), max_size(), empty(), and swap() methods.

Usage

The following code demonstrates how to use the map<string, int> to count occurrences of words. It uses the word as the key and the count as the value.
#include <iostream>
#include <map>

int main()
{
    std::map<std::string, int> wordcounts;
    std::string s;

    while (std::cin >> s && s != "end")
    {
        ++wordcounts[s];
    }
    
    while (std::cin >> s && s != "end")
    {
        std::cout << s << ' ' << wordcounts[s] << '\n';
    }
    
    return 0;
}

When executed, program lets user type a series of words separated by spaces, and a word "end" to signify the end of input. Then user can input a word to query how many times it has occurred in the previously entered series.

The above example also demonstrates that the operator [] inserts new objects (using the default constructor) in the map if there is not one associated with the key. So integral types are zero-initialized, strings are initialized to empty strings, etc.

The following example illustrates inserting elements into a map using the insert function and searching for a key using a map iterator and the find function:

#include <iostream>
#include <map>
#include <utility> // To use make_pair function

int main()
{
    typedef std::map<char, int> MapType;
    MapType my_map;

    // Insert elements using insert function
    my_map.insert(std::pair<char, int>('a', 1));
    my_map.insert(std::pair<char, int>('b', 2));
    my_map.insert(std::pair<char, int>('c', 3));
    
    // You can also insert elements in a different way like shown below
    // Using function value_type that is provided by all standart containers
    my_map.insert(MapType::value_type('d', 4));
    // Using the utility function make_pair
    my_map.insert(std::make_pair('e', 5));
    // Using C++11 initializer list
    my_map.insert({'f', 6});                    
    
    //map keys are sorted automatically from lower to higher. 
    //So, my_map.begin() points to the lowest key value not the key which was inserted first.
    MapType::iterator iter = my_map.begin();

    // Erase the first element using the erase function
    my_map.erase(iter);

    // Output the size of the map using size function
    std::cout << "Size of my_map: " << my_map.size() << '\n';

    std::cout << "Enter a key to search for: ";
    char c;
    std::cin >> c;

    // find will return an iterator to the matching element if it is found
    // or to the end of the map if the key is not found
    iter = my_map.find(c);
    if (iter != my_map.end()) 
    {
        std::cout << "Value is: " << iter->second << '\n';
    }
    else 
    {
        std::cout << "Key is not in my_map" << '\n';
    }

    // You can clear the entries in the map using clear function
    my_map.clear();
    
    return 0;
}

Example shown above demonstrates the usage of some of the functions provided by map, such as insert() (place element into the map), erase() (remove element from the map), find() (check presence of the element in the container), etc.

When program is executed, six elements are inserted using the insert() function, then the first element is deleted using erase() function and the size of the map is outputted. Next, the user is prompted for a key to search for in the map. Using the iterator created earlier, the find() function searches for an element with the given key. If it finds the key, the program prints the element's value. If it doesn't find it, an iterator to the end of the map is returned and it outputs that the key could not be found. Finally all the elements in the tree are erased using clear().

Iterators

Maps may use iterators to point to specific elements in the container. An iterator can access both the key and the mapped value of an element:

// Declares a map iterator
std::map<Key, Value>::iterator it;

// Accesses the Key value 
it->first;

// Accesses the mapped value
it->second;

// The "value" of the iterator, which is of type std::pair<const Key, Value>
(*it);                              

Below is an example of looping through a map to display all keys and values using iterators:
#include <iostream>
#include <map>

int main()
{
    std::map<std::string, int> data 
    {
     { "Bobs score", 10    },
     { "Martys score", 15  },
     { "Mehmets score", 34 },
     { "Rockys score", 22  },
     // The next values are ignored because elements with the same keys are already in the map
     { "Rockys score", 23  }, 
     { "Mehmets score", 33 } 
    };
    
    // Iterate over the map and print out all key/value pairs.
    for (const auto& element : data)
    {
        std::cout << "Who(key = first): " << element.first;
        std::cout << " Score(value = second): " << element.second << '\n';
    }
    
    // If needed you can iterate over the map with the use of iterator,
    // Note that the long typename of the iterator in this case can be replaced with auto keyword
    for (std::map<std::string, int>::iterator iter = data.begin(); iter != data.end(); ++iter) 
    {
        std::cout << "Who(key = first): " << iter->first;
        std::cout << " Score(value = second): " << iter->second << '\n';
    }

    return 0;
}

For compiling above sample on GCC compiler, must use specific standard select flag.g++ -std=c++11 source.cpp -o srcThis will output the keys and values of the entire map, sorted by keys.

See also
Container (abstract data type)
Standard Template Library#Containers
Unordered associative containers C++

References

C++ Standard Library
Associative arrays